Rhagamys is an extinct genus of rodents in the subfamily Murinae, the Old World mice and rats. The genus was established by the Swiss zoologist Charles Immanuel Forsyth Major to accommodate Rhagamys orthodon, commonly known as Hensel's field mouse or the Tyrrhenian field rat, which is the only species in the genus. It was endemic to the Mediterranean islands of Corsica and Sardinia, where it first appeared in the fossil record in the Late Pleistocene, and was relatively large in size, weighing up to 50 g. Its closest living relatives are of the genus Apodemus.

Taxonomy and evolution
The ancestors of Rhagamys, belonging the widespread genus Rhagapodemus, first arrived in Corsica-Sardinia during the Early-Late Pliocene transition, around 3.6 million years ago. Three chronospecies of the lineage have been named, including "Rhagapodemus" azzarolii from the earliest Late Pliocene, followed by "Rhagapodemus" minor from the Early Pleistocene, succeeded by Rhagamys orthodon, which ranged from the Middle Pleistocene to Holocene. The molars of Rhagamys are similar to those of the wood mouse (Apodemus sylvaticus) and the striped field mouse (Apodemus agrarius) but are larger and more derived, being hypsodont teeth suitable for feeding on a coarse, abrasive diet. Over time, Rhagamys orthodon increased in size and became larger than the broad-toothed field mouse (Apodemus mystacinus).

History
Before the arrival of humans on the islands in about 8000 BC, Corsica and Sardinia had their own highly endemic depauperate terrestrial mammal fauna which besides Rhagamys orthodon included a species of dwarf mammoth (Mammuthus lamarmorai), the Tyrrhenian vole (Microtus henseli), the Sardinian pika (Prolagus sardus), one or two species of shrew belonging to the genus Asoriculus, a mole (Talpa tyrrhenica), the Sardinian dhole (Cynotherium sardous), a galictine mustelid (Enhydrictis galictoides), three species of otter (Algarolutra majori, Sardolutra ichnusae, Megalenhydris barbaricina) and a deer (Praemegaceros cazioti). The small mammals, including Rhagamys, persisted for many thousands of years after the first human arrival on the islands, with the youngest radiocarbon dates for Rhagamys dating to around 800 BC. It was almost certainly extinct by the 6th century AD. The cause of the extinction is unknown, but may be due to invasive species introduced by new arrivals to the islands such as Carthaginians and the Romans.

The only endemic mammal still found on the islands is the Sardinian long-eared bat (Plecotus sardus).

References

Old World rats and mice
Mammals of Europe
Pleistocene rodents
Rodent genera
Taxa named by Charles Immanuel Forsyth Major
Extinct rodents
Mammals described in 1856
Fossil taxa described in 1856